The 2015–16 Arkansas–Pine Bluff Golden Lions men's basketball team represented the University of Arkansas at Pine Bluff during the 2015–16 NCAA Division I men's basketball season. The Golden Lions, led by eighth year head coach George Ivory, played their home games at the K. L. Johnson Complex and were members of the Southwestern Athletic Conference. The Golden Lions finished the season with an 8–25 overall record, 6–12 in conference and finished in a three-way tie for seventh place. They lost to Alabama A&M in the first round of the SWAC tournament.

Roster

Schedule

|-
!colspan=9 style="background:#000000; color:#FFD700;"| Non-conference regular season

|-
!colspan=9 style="background:#000000; color:#FFD700;"|SWAC regular season

|-
!colspan=9 style="background:#000000; color:#FFD700;"| SWAC tournament

References

Arkansas–Pine Bluff Golden Lions men's basketball seasons
Arkansas-Pine Bluff
Arkansas-Pine Bluff Golden Lions men's basketball
Arkansas-Pine Bluff Golden Lions men's basketball